Rail transport in Russia runs on one of the biggest railway networks in the world. Russian railways are the third longest by length and third by volume of freight hauled, after the railways of the United States and China. In overall density of operations (freight ton-kilometers + passenger-kilometers)/length of track, Russia is second only to China. Rail transport in Russia has been described as one of the economic wonders of the 19th, 20th, and 21st centuries.

JSC Russian Railways has a near-monopoly on long-distance train travel in Russia, with a 98.6% market share in 2017. Independent long-distance carriers include Grand Service Express TC, Tverskoy Express, TransClassService, Sakhalin Passenger Company, Kuzbass Suburb, and Yakutian Railway.

Characteristics
Russia is larger than both the United States and China in terms of total land area, therefore its rail density (rail tracking/country area) is lower compared to those two countries. Since Russia's population density is also much lower than that of China and the United States, the Russian railways carry freight and passengers over very long distances, often through vast, nearly empty spaces.  Coal and coke make up almost one-third of the freight traffic and have average hauls of around 1,500 kilometers, while ferrous metals make up another 10 percent of freight traffic and travel an average of over 1,900 kilometers. Railroads are often key to getting supplies shipped to remote parts of the country as many people do not have access to other reliable means of shipping.

Like most railways, rail transport in Russia carries both freight and passengers. It is one of the most freight-dominant railways in the world, behind only Canada, the United States, and Estonia in the ratio of freight ton-kilometers to passenger-kilometers. However, per head of population intercity passenger travel is far greater than the United States (which has the lowest long-distance passenger train usages in the developed world).

Structure

Russia's railways are divided into seventeen regional railways, from the October Railway serving the St. Petersburg region to the Far Eastern Railway serving Vladivostok, with the free-standing Kaliningrad and Sakhalin Railways on either end. The regional railways were closely coordinated by the Ministry of the Means of Communication until 2003, and the Joint Stock Company Russian Railways since then – including the pooling and redistribution of revenues. This has been crucial to two long-standing policies of cross-subsidization: to passenger operations from freight revenues, and to coal shipments from other freight.

History

The Russian railways were a collection of mostly privately owned and operated companies during most of the 19th century, though many had been constructed with heavy government involvement and financing. The tsarist government began mobilizing and nationalizing the rail system as World War I approached, and the new communist government finished the nationalization process. With the dissolution of the USSR in 1991, the Russian Federation was left with three-fifths of the railway track of the Union as well as nine-tenths of the highway mileage – though only two-fifths of the port capacity.

In the 21st century, substantial changes in the Russian railways have been discussed and implemented in the context of two government reform documents: Decree No. 384 of 18 May 2001 of the Government of the Russian Federation, "A Program for Structural Reform of Railway Transport", and Order No. 877 of 17 June 2008 of the Government of the Russian Federation, "The Strategy for Railway Development in the Russian Federation to 2030". The former focused on restructuring the railways from government-owned monopoly to private competitive sector; the latter focused on ambitious plans for equipment modernization and network expansion.

Timeline of railway implementation

1837 – the Tsarskoye Selo Railway (27 km);

1843 – Inkerman Railway (about one km);

1848 – the Warsaw-Vienna Railway (800 km);

1851 – Nikolaevskaya railway (645 km);

1854 — Connecting Line (4,73 km), first trans-line connector to form the future network;

1855 – The Balaklava Railway (about 23 km);

1861 – the Riga-Dinaburg railway (218 km);

1862 – the Petersburg-Warsaw Railway (1116 km);

1862 – the Moscow-Nizhny Novgorod railway (437 km);

1868 – Moscow-Kursk railway (543 km);

1870 – Yaroslavl Railway;

1878 – the Ural Mining and Railroads (by 1880–715 km);

1884 – Catherine (Krivorog (g)) railway) (by 1884–523 km);

1890 – Samara-Zlatoust railway (1888 – Samara-Ufa, by 1893 about 1500 km);

1898 – the Perm-Kotlas railway;

1900 – The Ussuri railway (964 km);

1900 – the Moscow-Savyolovo line;

1903 – the Sino-Eastern Railway (Manchurian, Chinese Changchun, Harbin);

1905 – Trans-Baikal Railway; The Circum-Baikal Railway; Petersburg-Vologda railway;

1906 – Theological Railway; The Tashkent railway;

1908 – Little Ring of the Moscow Railway;

1915 – the Altai Railway;

1916 – the Amur Railway; The Volga-Bugulma Railway; West-Ural railway; The Moscow-Kazan railway; North-Eastern Ural Railway; The Trans-Siberian Railway (historical part);

1926 – the Achinsk-Minusinsk railway;

1930 – the Turkestan-Siberian Railway;

1936 – 1937 – Norilsk Railway;

1940 – Kanash–Cheboksary;

1944 – The Big Ring of the Moscow Railway;

1969 – the line of Verbilki–Dubna;

1978 – Rostov-Krasnodar–Tuapse; Yurovsky–Anapa;

2003 – the Baikal–Amur Mainline;

2013 – Adler–Rosa Farm;

2016 – Moscow Central Circle (based on Little Ring of the Moscow Railway);

2017 – The railway line bypassing Ukraine;

2017 – the Amur–Yakutsk railway;

2019 – Railway bridge to the Crimea;

2023 – High-speed mainline Moscow–Kazan (draft);

2023 – Northern Latitudinal Railway (project);

2030 – Magadan Highway (Lower Bestyah–Moma–Magadan) (project).

Statistics
Russian Railways accounts for 2.5% of Russia's GDP and employs 800,000 people. The percentage of passenger traffic that goes by rail is unknown, since no statistics are available for private transportation such as private automobiles. In 2007, about 1.3 billion passengers and 1.3 billion tons of freight went via Russian Railways. In 2007 the company owned 19,700 goods and passenger locomotives, 24,200 passenger cars (carriages) (2007) and 526,900 freight cars (goods wagons) (2007). A further 270,000 freight cars in Russia are privately owned.

In 2009 Russia had 128,000 kilometers of common-carrier railway line, of which about half is electrified and carries most of the traffic, over 40% was double track or better.

In 2013 railways carried nearly 90% of Russia's freight, excluding pipelines.

Industrial railways
Besides the common-carrier railways that are well covered by government statistics there are many industrial railways (such as mining or lumbering railways) whose statistics are covered separately, and which in 1981 had a total length almost equal to the length of the common carrier railways. Currently (2008) they are only about half the length of the common-carrier system. In 1980, about two-thirds of their freight flowed to and from the common-carrier railroads while the remaining third was internal transport only on an industrial railways. (For example, a lumber company uses its private industrial railways to transport logs from a forest to its sawmill.) About 4% of the industrial railway traffic was on track jointly "owned" by two companies.

Narrow-gauge railways

In 1981, there were 33,400 kilometers of narrow gauge.
 Sakhalin Railway – located on Sakhalin, gauge of 
 Apsheronsk narrow-gauge railway – located in the Krasnodar Krai, gauge of 
 Kudemskaya narrow-gauge railway – located in the Arkhangelsk Oblast, Severodvinsk, gauge of 
 Alapayevsk narrow-gauge railway – located in the Sverdlovsk Oblast, Alapayevsk, gauge of 
 Altsevo peat railway – located in Nizhny Novgorod Oblast, gauge of 
 Kerzhenets peat railway – located in Nizhny Novgorod Oblast, gauge of 
 Pishchalskoye peat railway – located in Kirov Oblast, gauge of 
 Gorokhovskoye peat railway – located in Kirov Oblast, gauge of 
 Narrow-gauge railway of Decor-1 factory – located in the Arzamassky District, gauge of 
 Narrow-gauge railway of KSM-2 factory –  located in the Tver, gauge of

Railway infrastructure
Some Russian railways were modernized during the Soviet period.

Couplers
The SA3 coupler (Soviet Automatic coupler, model 3) used in Russia has several advantages over the Janney coupler used in the United States.

The SA3 coupler, while well-designed, has had problems with operating due to being made with lower quality steel, having a low quality of maintenance/repairs/rebuilding, and coupling cars at speeds higher than allowed by the rules.

Track gauge

The majority of Russia's rail network uses the 1,520 mm Russian gauge, which includes all metro systems and the majority of tram networks in the country.

The Sakhalin Railway, on Sakhalin Island used 1,067 mm Cape gauge from its construction under Japan until 2019, when the conversion to 1520 mm completed.

A section from the Poland–Russia border to Kaliningrad, uses the 1,435 mm Standard gauge. Unlike the Sakhalin Railway, which carries freight and passengers, the standard-gauge line in Kaliningrad carries only freight at this time.

Kaliningrad's tram network also uses metre-gauge tracks at 1,000 mm, as does Stavropol krai's Pyatigorsk network.

Railway universities

There are many railway colleges in Russia which are higher educational institutes that train students for railway careers, mainly in engineering.

Command and control system
Since 2010 Russian Railways had started an overhaul of its computer systems. The overhaul will centralize the management of data into new computing hubs, restructure the collection of information on the railway's field operations, and integrate new automation software to help the railway strategise how to deploy its assets. The geriatric machines that the new mainframes will replace include Soviet-built clones of IBM's Cold War–era computers, called ES EVM (the transliterated Russian acronym for "unified system of electronic computing machines").

Foreign activities
The RZD operates the Armenian Railway until 2038. During this period, at least 570 million euro will be invested, 90% going into infrastructure.

Joint ventures have been formed to build and operate a port in Rasŏn in North Korea, and rail links connecting that port to the Russian rail network at the North Korean-Russian border Khasan-Tumangang.

Trans-Eurasia Logistics is a joint venture with RZD that operates container freight trains between Germany and China via Russia.

Rail links with adjacent countries
Voltage of electrification systems not necessarily compatible.
 Same gauge:
 Estonia
 Latvia
 Lithuania – only from the Kaliningrad Oblast exclave
 Belarus
 Ukraine – closed.
 Georgia – currently, only connects with the breakaway Republic of Abkhazia; the line beyond, to Georgia proper, is closed for political reasons.
 Azerbaijan
 Kazakhstan
 Mongolia
 Break-of-gauge:
 China, break-of-gauge  to 
 North Korea, break-of-gauge  to 
 Poland – only from the Kaliningrad Oblast exclave – break-of-gauge  to 
 Note that break-of-gauge between Poland and Belarus near Brest is in use of Russian Railways mostly

See also

 Tsarskoye Selo Railway
 Communications in Russia
 Elektrichka
 History of rail transport in Russia
 List of railways in Russia
 List of named passenger trains of Russia
 Ministry of Railways of the USSR
 Moscow – Saint Petersburg Railway
 Russian gauge
 Railway engineering of Russia
 Russian Post
 Russian Railways
 Sibirjak
 Trans-Siberian Railway
 Transport in Russia
 Transportation in Moscow
 Varshavsky Rail Terminal, St.Petersburg – national railway museum of Russia
 The Museum of the Moscow Railway
 Rizhsky Rail Terminal, Home of the Moscow Railway Museum
 Emperor railway station in Pushkin town
 Rolling stock manufacturers of Russia

References

In English
 Boublikoff, A.A. "A suggestion for railroad reform" in book: Buehler, E.C. (editor) "Government ownership of railroads", Annual debater's help book (vol. VI), New York, Noble and Noble, 1939; pp. 309–318. Original in journal "North American Review, vol. 237, pp. 346+. (Title is misleading. It's 90% about Russian railways.)
 European Conference of Ministers of Transport, "Regulatory Reform of Railways in Russia," 2004. Regulatory Reform of Railways in Russia
 Hunter, Holland "Soviet transport experience: Its lessons for other countries", Brookings Institution 1968.
 Omrani, Bijan. Asia Overland: Tales of Travel on the Trans-Siberian and Silk Road Odyssey Publications, 2010 
 Pittman, Russell, "Blame the Switchman? Russian Railways Restructuring After Ten Years," working paper, Antitrust Division, U.S. Department of Justice, 2011. Blame the Switchman? Russian Railways Restructuring After Ten Years
 "Railroad Facts" (Yearbook) Association of American Railroads, Washington, DC (annual).
 "Transportation in America", Statistical Analysis of Transportation in the United States (18th edition), with historical compendium 1939–1999, by Rosalyn A. Wilson, pub. by Eno Transportation Foundation Inc., Washington DC, 2001. See table: Domestic Intercity Ton-Miles by Mode, pp. 12–13.
 UN (United Nations) Statistical Yearbook. The earlier editions were designated by date (such as 1985/86) but later editions use the edition number (such as 51st). After 1985/86 the "World railway traffic" table was dropped.After the 51st ? edition, the long table: "Railways: traffic" was dropped resulting in no more UN railway statistics.
 Urba CE, "The railroad situation : a perspective on the present, past and future of the U.S. railroad industry". Washington : Dept. of Transportation, Federal Railroad Administration, Office of Policy and Program Development Govt. Print. Off., 1978.
 VanWinke, Jenette and Zycher, Benjamin; "Future Soviet Investment in Transportation, Energy, and Environmental Protection" A Rand Note. The Rand Corporation, Santa Monica, CA, 1992. Rand Soviet Transport
 Westwood J.N, 2002 "Soviet Railways to Russian Railways" Palgrave Macmillan.
 Ward, Christopher J., "Brezhnev's Folly: The Building of BAM and Late Soviet Socialism", University of Pittsburgh Press, 2009.

In Russian
 Плакс, А.В. & Пупынин, В.Н. Электрические железные дороги (Electric Railroads). Москва, Транспорт, 1993.
 Резер, С.М. Взаимодействие транспортных систем. Москва, Наука, 1985.
 Шадур, Л.А. (editor). Вагоны: конструкция, теория и расчёт (Railroad cars: construction, theory and calculations). Москва, Транспорт, 1980.
 Фед = Федеральная служба государственной статистики (Federal government statistical service). Транспорт в России (Transportation in Russia) (annual) Available online.
 Филиппов, М.М. (editor). Железные Дороги. Общий Курс (Railroads. General Course). Москва, Транспорт, 3rd ed. 1981. (4th ed. 1991 with new editor: Уздин, М.М.).
 Шафиркин, Б.И. Единая Транспортная Система СССР и взаимодействие различных видов транспорта (Unified Transportation System of the USSR and interaction of various modes of transportation). Москва, Высшая школа, 1983.
 Шадур. Л. А. (editor). Вагоны (Railway cars). Москва, Транспорт, 1980.

External links

 Russian Railways Official Site 
 Steam on Sakhalin Island 
 Russian Railway in 1935
 
 Rail Fan Europe
  Shows electrification status and also many Industrial railways.